Valera is a district of Bongará Province, in the Department of Amazonas, Peru. It includes the villages of San Pablo (capital of Valera), Cocahuayco, Cocachimba-La Coca, Nuevo Horizontes and Tingorbamba. It is situated between the cities of Pedro Ruiz Gallo and Chachapoyas.

References

Districts of the Bongará Province
Districts of the Amazonas Region